Francine Landre (born 26 July 1970 in Les Abymes, Guadeloupe) is a French athlete who specialises in the 400 meters. Landre competed in the women's 4 x 400 meter relay at the 1996 Summer Olympics.

References 
 sports reference

French female sprinters
Guadeloupean female sprinters
Olympic athletes of France
French people of Guadeloupean descent
Athletes (track and field) at the 1996 Summer Olympics
1970 births
Living people
European Athletics Championships medalists
Mediterranean Games gold medalists for France
Mediterranean Games medalists in athletics
Athletes (track and field) at the 1991 Mediterranean Games
Athletes (track and field) at the 2001 Mediterranean Games
Olympic female sprinters